Macki may refer to:
Mački (disambiguation), two villages in Slovenia and Croatia
Maćki, a village in Poland
Stephen "Macki" Mackintosh, a fictional character in Hollyoaks soap opera